The 1976 Arkansas Razorbacks football team represented the University of Arkansas in the Southwest Conference (SWC) during the 1976 NCAA Division I football season. In their 19th and final year under head coach Frank Broyles, the Razorbacks compiled a 5–5–1 record (3–4–1 against SWC opponents), finished in sixth place in the SWC, and outscored their opponents by a combined total of 220 to 204. After opening the season with five wins in the first six games, the Razorbacks went 0–4–1 in their final five games after a number of starters suffered season-ending injuries.

Ben Cowins averaged 6.3 yards per carry in 1976, the fourth-highest average in the nation. Steve Little averaged 44.4 yards per punt, the seventh-best nationally.

Schedule

Personnel

Season summary

Utah State

Oklahoma State

Tulsa

at TCU

at Houston

Rice

at Baylor

Texas A&M

vs SMU

Texas Tech

at Texas

Frank Broyles' final game as head coach

References

Arkansas
Arkansas Razorbacks football seasons
Arkansas Razorbacks football